Grand Union is the fifth studio album from the band Firebird, which was formed by Carcass guitarist Bill Steer with drummer Ludwig Witt. It was released in 2009 on Rise Above Records.  In addition to the nine original tracks, it features covers of James Taylor, Humble Pie and British bluesman Duster Bennett.

Reception

Greg Prato of AllMusic gave the disc 3.5 of 5 stars saying "Everything about this release reeks of the '70s" and that listeners should "be prepared to be transported to the heady days of incense, bell-bottoms, afros, and blacklight posters."

Track listing
Blue Flame 3:27 (Bill Steer, Smok Smoczkiewicz, Ludwig Witt)
Jack The Lad 2:04 (Steer, Smoczkiewicz, Witt)
Lonely Road 4:22 (Steer)
Fool For You 2:10 (James Taylor)
Silent Stranger 3:01 (Steer)
Release Me 3:55 (Steer)
Wild Honey 3:01 (Steer)
Gold Label 3:13 (Steer, Smoczkiewicz, Witt)
Worried Mind 2:14 (Duster Bennett)
See The Light 4:53 (Steer)
Four Day Creep 3:14 (Ida Cox)
Caledonia 5:40 (Steer)
Note: The track "Four Day Creep" was originally performed by British boogie rock band Humble Pie.

Personnel
Bill Steer: Vocals, Lead & Rhythm Guitars, Harmonica
Smok Smoczkiewicz: Bass
Ludwig Witt: Drums, Percussion

Production
Arranged by Firebird
Produced by Berno Paulsson and Firebird
Recorded, engineered and mixed by Berno Paulsson
Mastered by Tim Turan

External links
"Grand Union" at discogs Retrieved April 4, 2010

2009 albums
Rise Above Records albums
Firebird (band) albums